The Job Creation and Worker Assistance Act of 2002, increased carryback of net operating losses to 5 years (through September 2003), extended the exception under Subpart F for active financing income (through 2006), and created 30 percent expensing for certain capital asset purchases (through September 2004).

The act was signed into law by President George W. Bush on March 9, 2002.

External links

Special Report: Job Creation and Worker Assistance Act of 2002 (JCWAA), Prof. John Wachowicz at the University of Tennessee.
Senate Roll Call Vote - Job Creation and Worker Assistance
House Roll Call Vote - Job Creation and Worker Assistance Act

United States federal taxation legislation
Acts of the 107th United States Congress